The Majestic Cinema is the only working cinema in Bridgnorth, Shropshire, England. It opened in 1937, and  has three screens, a large screen with around 330 seats and two small screens with around 80 seats.  The upstairs screens previously made up a balcony when the cinema had only one screen.
The cinema is now operated by the Reel Cinemas chain.

References
 Reel Cinemas: Majestic Bridgnorth
  , Bridgnorth District Council, 2002.

Buildings and structures in Shropshire
Bridgnorth
Cinemas in Shropshire